Anticoreura is a monotypic moth genus of the family Notodontidae described by Prout in 1918. Its one species, Anticoreura salmoni,  first described by Herbert Druce in 1885, is found in Colombia.

Adults have dull, brownish-black forewings with a salmon-colored transverse band. The hindwings are iridescent blue with a dark gray fringe.

References

 

Notodontidae of South America
Monotypic moth genera